Gary "Bones" Berland (May 9, 1950 – February 6, 1988) was an American professional poker player who won five World Series of Poker bracelets.

Early life
Berland was born and raised in Gardena, California. He moved to Las Vegas, Nevada with his family in 1968 and attended UNLV. He dropped out of college after two years to become a full-time professional poker player. He also worked as a poker dealer during his early years as a poker player to supplement his income and help build his bankroll.

Poker career
Berland finished runner-up to Doyle Brunson in the 1977 World Series of Poker (WSOP) $10,000 no limit Texas hold'em main event, but did not cash because the tournament had a winner-take-all format until 1978. In 1978, Berland won the $500 Seven Card Stud and the $1,000 Seven Card Razz events. His total winnings for these were more than $36,000. Berland also finished third in the 1986 Main Event. His total lifetime tournament winnings exceeded $300,000. Berland's 11 cashes at the World Series of Poker totaled $220,390.

According to Brunson, he died of a rare blood disorder.

World Series Of Poker Bracelets

References

External links
 Legends of Poker: Gary "Bones" Berland

1950 births
1988 deaths
American poker players
World Series of Poker bracelet winners
People from Gardena, California
People from the Las Vegas Valley